Bezymyanny (lit. nameless) is an urban locality (an urban-type settlement) in Aldansky District of the Sakha Republic, Russia, located  from Aldan, the administrative center of the district. As of the 2010 Census, it had no recorded population.

History
Urban-type settlement status was granted to it in 1981.

Administrative and municipal status
Within the framework of administrative divisions, the urban-type settlement of Bezymyanny is incorporated within Aldansky District as the Settlement of Bezymyanny. As a municipal division, the territories of the Settlement of Bezymyanny and the Town of Tommot are incorporated within Aldansky Municipal District as Tommot Urban Settlement.

References

Notes

Sources
Official website of the Sakha Republic. Registry of the Administrative-Territorial Divisions of the Sakha Republic. Aldansky District. 

Urban-type settlements in the Sakha Republic